Newcomb's Ranch is a roadhouse at  in elevation in the Angeles National Forest, near Los Angeles, California. It is the only private property along the Angeles Crest Highway and is very popular with motorcyclists and is called "the informal headquarters for riders" by the Los Angeles Magazine and "one of Southern California's most famous Rickey Racer Roadhouses" by Motorcyclist. The roadhouse is located in unincorporated Los Angeles County, near La Cañada Flintridge.

The Newcomb family, who also created the Mount Waterman ski area, settled the property using the Land Revision Act of 1891, building the roadhouse in 1939. The roadhouse has served as a restaurant, hotel, general store, gas station, and as a brothel or love hotel. The inn burned in 1976, allegedly started by a cook who had been terminated. The fire destroyed most of the second floor, which was not rebuilt. It was purchased in late 2001 by Frederick Rundall, an oncologist who purchased the roadhouse from Lynn Newcomb and remodeled it in 2003 for $340,000. The second floor became lodging for employees.

Motorcyclist and comedian Jay Leno is a "frequent visitor" to Newcomb's.

The roadhouse closed in 2009 for the Station Fire. In January 2010 following the storm closure of Angeles Crest Highway between Newcomb's and Los Angeles, as well as a South Coast Air Quality Management District violation for operating a diesel generator without permit, Rundall shelved remodeling plans and discussed closing down completely.

The ranch was closed in March 2020 and put up for sale in June 2021. As of January 2023, the ranch is still closed and up for sale.

References

External links

 

Motorcycling subculture in the United States
San Gabriel Mountains
Restaurants in California
Restaurants established in 1939
Buildings and structures in Los Angeles County, California
Tourist attractions in Los Angeles County, California
1939 establishments in California